Jadera coturnix is a species of soapberry bug in the family Rhopalidae. It is found in Central America, North America, and South America.

Subspecies
These two subspecies belong to the species Jadera coturnix:
 Jadera coturnix coturnix (Burmeister, 1835)
 Jadera coturnix rufoculis (Kirby, 1890)

References

Articles created by Qbugbot
Insects described in 1835
Serinethinae